Clarendon is a parish in Jamaica. It is located on the south of the island, roughly halfway between the island's eastern and western ends. Located in the county of Middlesex, it is bordered by Manchester on the west, Saint Catherine in the east, and in the north by Saint Ann. Its capital and largest town is May Pen.

History

Clarendon was named in honour of the Lord Chancellor Sir Edward Hyde, Earl of Clarendon. The most recent parish was formed from a combination of three parishes: St. Dorothy's, Vere and the old parish of Clarendon. Before the merger, the capital was Chapelton. Clarendon Parish was one of the original seven Anglican parishes of Jamaica set up by Sir Thomas Modyford in 1664, and it has been reorganized numerous times since. Parish registers, which are records kept by the parish church of religious events such as baptisms, marriages, and burials, are still extant from Clarendon parish almost as far back as its foundation, with the first recorded baptism dated in 1666.

Geography and population

Covering an area of 1,196 km2, Clarendon ranks as Jamaica's third largest parish. The parish is predominantly a wide plain, marked by several rivers, including the Rio Minho, which runs the length of the parish. Toward the northern end of the parish lies the Mocho Mountains, (2000 ft), and Bull Head Mountain range (2800 ft), which is considered to be the geographical centre of the island. The Vere plain is another significant geographical feature.

Portland Point, the southernmost point of Jamaica, is on a peninsula in Clarendon which also hosts Portland Point Lighthouse.  On the same peninsula are Jackson Bay beach, the flood-prone community of Portland Cottage, and two different locations both called Rocky Point: a residential community on the western side of the peninsula, and a port used primarily for the export of alumina on the eastern side of the peninsula.

With a population at an estimated 246,322, Clarendon is one of the most populous parishes in the island. May Pen, the capital, has a population estimated at around 60,000.

Notable towns
 Chapelton
 Hayes
 Frankfield
 Lionel Town
 May Pen
 Palmers Cross
 Race Course
 Rocky Point

Economy

Bauxite, Jamaica's major mineral source, can be found extensively in Clarendon. Bauxite mining has been established in the parish by JAMALCO and ALCOA. Most of the island's tobacco is also grown in Clarendon, along with cotton, allspice (colloquially referred to as pimento), ginger, livestock, indigo, bananas, coffee, and cocoa. May Pen is also an important citrus packing centre, famous for 'Trout Hall' oranges. Additionally, dairy farming, fish farming, and copper mining have been carried on intermittently, and the sugar-cane production contributes significantly to the amount of sugar exported annually. The Denbigh agricultural showground is on the outskirts of May Pen.

One of the top ten credit unions in Jamaica, GSB Co-operative Credit Union has a branch here.

Clarendon is the location of the Milk River Bath, a mineral spa famous for the therapeutic value of its waters. The oldest church on the island is in Alley, the old capital of Vere.

Halse Hall Great House is one of the island's historic houses. The land on which the house stands was given to an English officer, Major Thomas Halse, in 1655, and was passed from him to Francis Sadler Halse. Halse played a leading role in the Maroon Wars.

The Denbigh Agricultural Show Grounds – once a year, on the weekend prior to Independence celebrations, a national Agriculture Show is staged here.

Vernamfield was the first car-racing track established in Jamaica. The track is located on the former American lend lease air base, Vernam Field (later Vernam Air Force Base) that was named in honor of World War I flyer Remington de B. Vernam. Vernam Field is known for drag racing.

 The Woodleigh racetrack outside of May Pen is known for dirtbike racing.
 It is the home of the New Yarmouth, Sevens Estate and Moneymusk Sugar factories.

Politics 
Clarendon Parish elects 6 MPs to the Parliament of Jamaica.

 Clarendon Central
 Clarendon Northern
 Clarendon North Central
 Clarendon North Western
 Clarendon South Eastern
 Clarendon South Western

Places of interest
Halse Hall Great House
Milk River Bath
Rio Minho
Vernam Field

Notable people
 Dennis Alcapone, reggae DJ and producer
 Michael Allen, Canadian football player
 Rodolph Austin, footballer
 Davina Bennett, model, Miss Universe 2017 Top 3
 Michael Blackwood
 Simon Brown, boxer
 Cocoa Tea, born Calvin George Scott, reggae singer
 Rohan Davey, American football quarterback
 Lacena Golding-Clarke, sprinter
 Mona Hammond
 Dalton Harris, singer
 Toots Hibbert, singer of Toots & The Maytals
 Elizabeth Home, Countess of Home
 Charles Howard, 1st Earl of Carlisle, governor of Jamaica from 1678–1680
 Leonard Howell, founder of Rastafari, born in Clarendon 1898
 Glen Johnson, boxer
 Linton Kwesi Johnson, poet
 Doreen Lawrence, Baroness Lawrence of Clarendon, mother of Stephen Lawrence
 Stephen Lawrence, murdered in Eltham, London in 1993, buried in Clarendon
 Barrington Levy, singer
 Atlee Mahorn, Canadian sprinter
 Freddie McGregor, singer
 Claude McKay, part of the Harlem Renaissance, born in James Hill
 Liz Mitchell, of Boney M.
 Derrick Morgan
 Raphael Morgan (Robert Josias Morgan), missionary and first Black Orthodox priest in the United States
 OMI, reggae singer
 Levi Roots, born Keith Valentine Graham, singer, chef
 Catherine Scott
 Jah Shaka
 Millie Small, singer and songwriter, best known for My Boy Lollipop
 Super Cat
 Roger Thompson, Canadian footballer

References

External links
Clarendon
 Political Geography

 
Parishes of Jamaica
1664 establishments in Jamaica
Populated places established in 1664